Edward Charles Stewart Robert Vane-Tempest-Stewart, 8th Marquess of Londonderry,  (18 November 1902 – 17 October 1955), styled Lord Stewart until 1915 and Viscount Castlereagh between 1915 and 1946, was a British peer and politician.

Early life
Born on 18 November 1902, into an Anglo-Irish aristocratic family with its roots in Ulster and County Durham, he was the second child and only son of the 7th Marquess of Londonderry and his wife, The Honourable Edith Helen Chaplin. King Edward VII stood sponsor at his christening in the Chapel Royal (St. James's Palace) on 16 December 1902, the other sponsors being his grandfather Lord Londonderry, Hon. Arthur Meade (later Earl of Clanwilliam), and the Duchess of Teck.

He was educated at Eton College. In 1911, he was a page at the coronation of King George V and Queen Mary. He was painted holding his grandfather's coronet by Philip de László. The portrait now hangs at Mount Stewart, County Down. 

He was known formally by his courtesy title, Viscount Castlereagh, before he inherited the Marquessate, and as Robin by close friends and family throughout his life.

Career
He worked as honorary attaché to the British Embassy in Rome and as a director of Londonderry Collieries, the family's coal mining company. A keen football fan, he was first a director and then chairman of Arsenal Football Club from 1939 to 1946.

Lord Londonderry was an accomplished public speaker and, prior to succeeding his father as Marquess in 1949, was the Unionist Member of Parliament for Down in the House of Commons of the United Kingdom from 1931 to 1945.

Marriage and family
He was married on 31 October 1931 at St Martin-in-the-Fields to Romaine Combe (d. 19 December 1951), the daughter of Major Boyce Combe, of Farnham, Surrey, and had issue:

 Lady Jane Antonia Frances Vane-Tempest-Stewart (born 11 August 1932); she married, firstly, Max Rayne, Baron Rayne, on 2 June 1965, had issue, widowed in 2003. She married, secondly, Robert Lacey in 2012, no issue. Lady Jane was one of Queen Elizabeth II's maids of honour at her coronation.
 Lady Annabel Vane-Tempest-Stewart (born 13 June 1934)
 Alexander Charles Robert Vane-Tempest-Stewart, 9th Marquess of Londonderry (7 September 1937 – 20 June 2012)

Lord Londonderry was a celebrated host and practical joker, reportedly once decorating the Christmas tree at Wynyard with condoms to startle a visiting cleric. He was an attentive husband and devoted father, entertaining his family with stories and tales. Also regarded as slightly eccentric, on one occasion Lord Londonderry had taken to his bed drunk, when Ruth Graham, the wife of the American evangelist Billy Graham, came to call. Although informed that His Lordship was "indisposed", Mrs Graham insisted upon admission to his bedroom, having "come all the way on Billy's account". She was duly announced. Lord Londonderry threw aside the bedsheets and shouted, "Get in."

He had an awkward and distant relationship with his parents, especially his father. The two men took opposite sides during industrial disputes involving the family coal mines, most notably during the General Strike in 1926. When he married Romaine, a brewer's daughter, his family viewed the union with disdain. It was a happy marriage by all accounts, but tragedy struck when Lady Londonderry died from cancer in 1951 and her husband plunged into depression and alcoholism.

"Daddy changed, literally overnight, into a complete drunk," Lady Annabel Goldsmith, his daughter, recalled. "It was awful. He would collapse while making speeches to the cricket club, that kind of thing. He was on the bottle night and day."

Lord Londonderry died from liver failure on 17 October 1955, at age 52. He was buried alongside his wife at Wynyard Park and both were later re-interred in the Londonderry family vault at St Mary's Church, Longnewton, County Durham.

References

External links

1902 births
1955 deaths
People educated at Eton College
Vane-Tempest-Stewart
Vane-Tempest-Stewart
Vane-Tempest-Stewart
Londonderry, M8
Ulster Unionist Party members of the House of Commons of the United Kingdom
Arsenal F.C. directors and chairmen
Deputy Lieutenants of Down
Deputy Lieutenants of Durham
Robin
Deaths from liver failure
8